John Craig Chenoweth (May 4, 1943 – August 10, 1991) was a Minnesota politician, executive director of the Minneapolis Municipal Employees Retirement Fund, and a victim of an anti-gay hate crime. As a member of the Minnesota Democratic–Farmer–Labor Party, he served in the Minnesota State House (1969–71) and Senate (1971–79).

Early life and career
John Craig Chenoweth was born in Saint Paul, Minnesota, on May 4, 1943. He was educated at the Johnson High School, New York Institute of Finance, Saint Paul Seminary School of Divinity at University of St. Thomas and Saint John's University. He also attended John Carroll University and William Mitchell College of Law, but did not graduate. Chenoweth served in the Minnesota House of Representatives from 1969 to 1971 and in the Minnesota Senate from 1971 to 1979. Before he was first elected, he was a Saint Paul Municipal Court law clerk and congressional campaign director. In November 1979, he resigned his term to become the executive director of the Minneapolis Municipal Employees Retirement Fund. He held the position until May 1990, when he resigned.

Personal life
He was married to Mary Sharon Naughton from 1969 to 1977, by whom he had a son, John.

Death
Chenoweth was murdered by gunshot on the beach (a gay hangout area at the time) in Minneapolis, on August 10, 1991. 19-year-old Cord Draszt was seriously wounded in the same shooting. The murderer, Jay Thomas Johnson, who was also gay, had shot and killed another gay man in Loring Park 11 days earlier, on July 31, 1991. The victim of that crime was 21-year-old Joel Larson.

References

External links 

1943 births
1991 deaths
1991 murders in the United States
20th-century American politicians
American victims of anti-LGBT hate crimes
Catholics from Minnesota
College of Saint Benedict and Saint John's University alumni
Heads of United States federal agencies
Law clerks
LGBT Roman Catholics
LGBT state legislators in Minnesota
Democratic Party members of the Minnesota House of Representatives
Democratic Party Minnesota state senators
People murdered in Minnesota
Politicians from Saint Paul, Minnesota
Saint Paul Seminary School of Divinity alumni
Violence against gay men in the United States
Violence against men in North America
20th-century American LGBT people